Beautiful Days is a music festival that takes place in August at Escot Park, near Ottery St Mary, Devon. The festival was founded by, and is managed by the band The Levellers and was first held in 2003.  The festival has no corporate sponsorship or branding, leading to Virtual Festivals proclaiming it "the festival that sells out ... by not selling out".  In 2011 Beautiful Days was pronounced "Best Family Festival" by the UK Festival Awards, later winning the "Grass Roots Festival Award" in 2015, as well as the "Best Medium Festival" award from FestivalKidz the same year.  Every festival from 2003 to 2021 sold out in advance;  although the 2020 festival was cancelled due to the COVID-19 pandemic. The current capacity is 17,500.

History
The Levellers began the festival at Escot Park in 2003, after a previous venture (the Green Blade Festival) ran into licensing difficulties.  The Levellers' singer Mark Chadwick explained the thinking behind the ethos of the new festival in an interview with eFestivals

The festival is held on the penultimate weekend of August, which until 2017 was the same weekend as the now defunct V Festival; Chadwick stated that although this was not originally deliberate, he liked it because "the ethos of the festival is (the) antithesis of V."

Musical styles

Beautiful Days has a more diverse range of musical artists than many other festivals. Headline artists have included reggae (Lee "Scratch" Perry, The Wailers), alternative rock (James, Carter the Unstoppable Sex Machine), punk (The Stranglers, The Pogues), post-punk (Killing Joke, Public Image Ltd), country rock (Steve Earle), folk rock (Frank Turner), dance (Leftfield), gothic rock (The Sisters of Mercy) and blues (Seasick Steve).  A number of acts from outside the US and UK which may be less familiar to festival crowds are booked each year; in recent years these have included Tinariwen (Mali), Seeed (Germany), Katzenjammer (Norway), Dubioza kolektiv (Bosnia) and Hoffmaestro (Sweden).  Traditionally, The Levellers open the festival with an acoustic set in the Big Top on Friday afternoon, and close it by headlining the main stage on Sunday, followed by a firework display.

Stages

The first two festivals were held over two days (Saturday and Sunday) and utilised two stages, named the Main Stage and the Big Top. In 2005 it became a three-day festival with the addition of bands playing on the Friday, and has since expanded the number of stages.  Between 2012 and 2018 there were six main stages; the two mentioned above, plus the Little Big Top, the Bimble Inn, the Bandstand and the Theatre Tent, the main stage and Big Top hosting the majority of established acts, with the Bimble Inn and Bandstand showcasing lesser known acts.  The Little Big Top is primarily dance-oriented, whilst the Theatre tents provides theatre, cabaret, comedy and children's acts.  In 2019 the Bandstand was removed to make way for a larger Theatre Tent, with some acoustic acts performing in the Fiddler's Arms.

Facilities
Beautiful Days has the usual range of festival facilities.  There are four bars - three with Levellers-related names (Hope Tavern, Fiddler's Arms and Dirty Davey's) plus the Redwoods Bar, which are run by the local Otter Brewery, numerous food stalls, and a shop run by the village shop from nearby Talaton.  There is a large children's area with activities and workshops run by the Majical Youth Theatre, along with child-friendly performances in the Theatre Tent. There are camping sections, including a family section and a disabled section, and a large area for camper vans and other live-in vehicles.

Festival details

Gallery

See also 
 Levellers (band)

References

External links 
Beautiful Days Facebook page
Beautiful Days on Twitter
Beautiful Days e-festivals page

Music festivals in Devon
Counterculture festivals
Rock festivals in England
2003 establishments in England
Music festivals established in 2003